The '89 Cubs are a power trio hailing from Omaha, Nebraska. The band features members from Bright Eyes, Desaparecidos, and The Good Life, all bands that are signed to Saddle Creek Records.  Their sole full-length, There Are Giants in the Earth was released in November 2004.

The name is presumably in reference to the Chicago Cubs, who, after winning the National League East division championship, lost the 1989 National League Championship Series to the San Francisco Giants.

Band members
Ryan Fox -  guitar, vocals, keyboards, percussion, woodwinds, samples
 Dan Brennan - bass guitar, vocals, percussion, yelling, high five
 Matt Baum - drums, samples, yelling, high five

Guest musicians
A.J. Mogis - Mixing
Greg Fox (guitarist) - guitar
 Terry Brennan- Guitar
 Kevin Ahern -  Clapping, Stomping, Yells

Discography
There Are Giants in the Earth (2004 · Slowdance Records)

External links
The '89 Cubs on MySpace
The '89 Cubs on PureVolume
Lazy-i Interview: December 2004

References

Indie rock musical groups from Nebraska
Musical groups from Omaha, Nebraska